Afghan Ministry of Women's Affairs (MOWA) was a ministry in the Afghan government which was established in late 2001 by the Afghan Interim Administration.

MOWA was the lead agency for promoting women's rights and advancement in Afghanistan. MOWA had a major shift in its strategy from welfare oriented, direct implementing approach to a policy influencing body by 2002.

The last minister of Women's, appointed in 2015, was Delbar Nazari.

With the announcement by the newly-established Taliban government of the Cabinet of Afghanistan on 7 September 2021, the Ministry of Women's Affairs no longer exists and was replaced by the Ministry for the Propagation of Virtue and the Prevention of Vice.

Functions

Provide direction, build inter-ministerial collaboration and develop the capacity of government agencies to ensure that policy formulation, planning, implementation, reporting and monitoring equitably respond to the differential needs and situations of women and men. This is being done by:

Facilitating the setting up of gender focal points and providing them with gender advocacy skills, gender mainstreaming tools and related trainings;
Establish partnership with training institutions and training units of government ministries to incorporate curricula on gender in their training programs; and,
Facilitate the collection, compilation, analysis and dissemination of data and information that would track changes on the lives of women and men and inform policy planning and programme development.
Pilot and develop focused projects for addressing the needs of target groups of special concern by working in collaborative partnerships with donors, developing government mechanisms for the identification and codification of measures to eliminate discriminatory and abusive practices, and develop its own mechanism for the promotion of media/communication activities and public awareness of all aspects of gender equality and women's rights.
Foster partnership and collaboration with women NGOs, human rights bodies, and civil society organizations for advocacy and mutual support in making government and donors respond effectively to women's concerns.
Monitor government's action and prepare periodic report on the compliance to international treaties and commitments and the implementation of national policies on women

Mission
To ensure that Afghanistan women's legal, economic, social, political, and civic rights including their right to be free from all forms of violence and discrimination are respected, promoted and fulfilled.

Structure and priorities
As the prime agency for women's advancement, MOWA is headed by a Minister who reports directly to the President and is a member of the Cabinet. The Minister is supported by a deputy minister for technical concerns and another for administrative and financial matters.

In the fiscal year March 2004 – 2005, MOWA has a total of 1,268 staff in Kabul and 28 other provinces. Provincial Department of Women's Affairs have not yet been set up in the provinces of Uruzan, Paktika, Daykundi and Panjshir.

Legal protection
With the adoption of the new Constitution defining the country's legal system and criteria, this department develops and expands its work within the Constitutional framework in order to further gender equality in the country. It liaises with the Ministry of Justice and the Commission of Judicial Reform to ensure that women's human rights be explicitly recognized and protected in the judicial system and the standards set under international human rights instruments and being fulfilled.

Women's Affairs Ministers of Afghanistan

See also
 Qadria Yazdanparast

References

External links
Official website
Official website 
Official website 
Afghan Women Leaders Connect
Women for Afghan Women

Women's Affairs
Afghanistan
Afghanistan
Women's rights in Afghanistan
Women's organisations based in Afghanistan